The men's singles tournament of the 2022 BWF World Championships took place from 22 to 28 August 2022 at the Tokyo Metropolitan Gymnasium in Tokyo.

Seeds

The seeding list was based on the World Rankings of 9 August 2022.

  Viktor Axelsen (champion)
  Kento Momota (second round)
  Anders Antonsen (first round)
  Chou Tien-chen (semi-finals)
  Lee Zii Jia (third round)
  Anthony Sinisuka Ginting (quarter-finals)
  Jonatan Christie (quarter-finals)
  Loh Kean Yew (quarter-finals)

  Lakshya Sen (third round)
  Ng Ka Long (third round)
  Rasmus Gemke (second round)
  Srikanth Kidambi (second round)
  Kanta Tsuneyama (first round)
  Lee Cheuk Yiu (third round)
  Wang Tzu-wei (third round)
  Kunlavut Vitidsarn (final)

Draw

Finals

Top half

Section 1

Section 2

Bottom half

Section 3

Section 4

References 

2022 BWF World Championships